The Brindaban Theatre is a mobile theatre group of the North-Eastern Indian state of Assam, founded by Ganesh Rai Medhi in 2011.

List of Plays

References

External links

Theatre companies in India
Culture of Assam
Guwahati
2011 establishments in Assam
Arts organizations established in 2011